Coleophora amasiella is a moth of the family Coleophoridae that can be found in Iran, Iraq, Jordan, Palestine, Syria, and Turkey.

The larvae feed on Alhagi pseudalhagi. They feed on the leaves of their host plant.

References

External links

amasiella
Moths of Asia
Moths described in 1867